Petridiobius is a genus of jumping bristletails in the family Machilidae. There are at least two described species in Petridiobius.

Species
 Petridiobius arcticus (Folsom, 1902)
 Petridiobius canadensis Sturm, 2001

References

Further reading

 

insect genera